Mayaheros urophthalmus, also known as the Mayan cichlid or Mexican mojarra is a species of cichlid.

Taxonomy
Previously, this species was a member of the genus Cichlasoma and the subgeneric section Nandopsis. However, the genus Cichlasoma is in revision and has been restricted to the 12 species of South American cichlids related to Cichlasoma bimaculatum. Thus, many of the approximately 100 species that were formerly members of Cichlasoma have yet to be formally assigned to a new genus.

Distribution
This species can be found in Middle America. It is native to the Atlantic slope of tropical Mesoamerica, ranging from eastern Mexico southward to Nicaragua. It was first recorded from Everglades National Park, Florida in 1983 and is now a common nonindigenous fish in South Florida.

Habitat
The Mayan cichlid inhabits freshwater marshes, mangrove swamps, lakes, rivers, rocky shorelines, lagoons, estuaries and coastal islands. Adults prefer coastal lagoons and rivers and may survive in marine conditions. It can be found in oxygen-rich areas near submerged vegetation and over muddy substrates. However, despite its preference for waters with dissolved oxygen content of at least 3.5 mg/L, it is capable of surviving in extreme hypoxia. This is because it is an oxygen conformer, becoming much less active in hypoxic water, and even surviving virtual anoxia for up to two hours. Unusually, this fish has been recorded in some cenotes in the Yucatan Peninsula.

Description
Mayaheros urophthalmus reaches a maximum length of 39.4 cm. This fish is one of the larger cichlids. The body is oval and flattened on the sides and the head is tapering towards the mouth. Fins are spiny. It has a base color of yellow-brown to gray-brown in most cases, that becomes intense red during breeding. The head and throat are reddish, especially in younger fish. The caudal fin and the soft-sections of the dorsal and anal fin are usually more or less reddish. Six wide green-black vertical stripes run across the sides of the body between the base of the pectoral fin and the base of the caudal fin. There is a large black eye spot circled with blue-green on the tail stem (hence the species scientific name urophthalmus (from oura, Greek for tail and ophthalmos, Greek for eye). Since the distribution area of the species is relatively large, this species may occurs in different colors, which may differ from the one described above.

Human relevance

In its native range, the Mayan cichlid is a popular food fish. For this reason it is the basis of a regional fishery, is commonly used in aquaculture. As in many animals, the red color is much more brilliant in wild specimens than captive ones, but one can help maintain some of its vibrance by feeding the fish live foods and foods that contain Vitamin A, which breaks down into the red pigment beta-carotene in the body.

It is among the most-studied of the Neotropical cichlids. To date, the Mayan cichlid has been most intensively studied at localities in southeastern Mexico on or near the Yucatan Peninsula.

Biology
The Mayan cichlid is philopatric, or site tenacious, i.e. - individuals are non-migratory and prefer to stay within a home range. The Mayan cichlid has a minimum temperature requirement of about 14 degrees Celsius. In its native range, it inhabits waters with temperatures from 18 - 34 degrees Celsius, but its optimal temperature range is 28 - 33 degrees Celsius.

The Mayan cichlid is capable of surviving in a variety of conditions. It is euryhaline and can survive in a range of salinity from 0 - 40 ppt. Experiments on captive specimens have shown that it can tolerate abrupt increases in salinity of up to 15 ppt. The Mayan cichlid has a broad range of tolerance to abiotic conditions and a broad functional repertoire to enable it to feed on about 20% of evasive prey due to its 6.8% jaw protrusion while feeding.

This species is also a dietary generalist, consuming organisms from a variety of disparate taxa. However, it is susceptible to malnourishment, apparently due to the requirement that a relatively large proportion of its diet be animal prey. The Mayan cichlid's diet includes plant matter, smaller fish, algae, detritus, snails, crustaceans and insects.

Reproduction
The Mayan cichlid is territorial and aggressive when breeding. As parents, Mayan cichlids are highly protective of their young, and they have several broods per year. This species is a monogamous, biparental substrate spawner that exhibits minimal sexual dimorphism and guards its fry for up to six weeks. All of these traits are greatly developed and represent an extreme in the general pattern found in the genus Mayaheros. In Mexico, the Mayan cichlid spawns for a nine-month period from March to November, particularly during the wet season from June to September. This corresponds to a period when the water temperature is at least 24 degrees Celsius. Multiple broods are raised per year. The fry appear to be adapted to lotic water. They exhibit strongly positive geotactic behavior, actively swimming down to the substrate upon hatching from the egg and adhering themselves to the bottom by means of three pairs of mucous glands.

See also
 List of freshwater aquarium fish species

References

External link

Heroini
Cichlid fish of Central America
Cichlid fish of North America
Freshwater fish of Mexico
Freshwater fish of the United States
Fish of Guatemala
Fish of Nicaragua
Taxa named by Albert Günther
Fish described in 1862
Articles containing video clips